Surprisingly Awesome was an American podcast formerly hosted by Adam Davidson and Adam McKay and subsequently hosted by Rachel Ward and frequently guest hosted by John Hodgman. In each episode, one of the hosts would take a seemingly boring topic, and try to make the other believe that it is interesting. These topics have varied from mold to interest rates. The podcast was hosted by Gimlet Media. 

The idea for the podcast came from the friendship that developed when McKay and Davidson worked together on The Big Short. McKay and Davidson would have long conversations when they would try to "out-fascinate" each other and make dull subjects seem interesting.

After searching for a new host for the show, Gimlet chose former Science Friday correspondent Flora Lichtman to take over, but decided to rebrand the show under a new name. On April 12, 2017 Gimlet CEO Alex Blumberg announced that Surprisingly Awesome was cancelled and would be replaced by Lichtman's new show, Every Little Thing.

Episodes

Reception
The Guardian reviewed the show positively saying, "Three episodes in, Surprisingly Awesome has managed to live up to its name and its mission."

References

External links 
 
 

Audio podcasts
2015 podcast debuts
Gimlet Media
Comedy and humor podcasts